Luis Fernando Camacho Haro (born January 11, 1983 in Zapopan, Jalisco), is a Mexican former footballer and current manager.

References

External links
 

1983 births
Living people
Mexican footballers
Association football midfielders
C.D. Guadalajara footballers
Club Tijuana footballers
Liga MX players
Ascenso MX players
Mexican football managers
Liga MX Femenil managers
Sportspeople from Jalisco
People from Zapopan, Jalisco